Ayatullah Durrani (1 January 1956 – 5 July 2020) was a Pakistani politician who served as Member of National Assembly of Pakistan and Minister of State for Industries and Production.

Early life and education
Born in Pring Abad, Mastung District of Balochistan, his mother tongue was Dehwari (Persian). He had a PhD Degree in Physics, and has served in various positions as President Peoples Students Federation, Kalat Division (1974–1976), President Peoples Students Federation Balochistan (1977–1984), Hon. Lecturer (Physics Dept) University of Baluchistan (1981–1988), Hon. Principal Scientific Adviser University of Baluchistan (1981–1988), Officer In-charge, Pakistan Scientific & Technology Information Center (PASTIC), President Peoples Youth Organization Baluchistan (1985–1989), Adviser To The Prime Minister Benazir Bhutto (Balochistan Affairs) (1989–1990), General Secretary, Peoples Democratic Alliance, Baluchistan (1992–1993), Member Islamic Ideology Council, Islamabad (1993–1996), Chairman Bait-ul-Mall Balochistan (1993–1996), Joint Secretary Pakistan Hockey Federation (1993–1996), President Baseball Association, Balochistan (1999–2002).

Career
He ran for the Parliament of Pakistan in General elections of 2008 from (NA-268) Kalat-cum-Mastung on Pakistan Peoples Party ticket. He won the elections and was sworn in as Minister of state for Industries and Production. He lost his seat in 2013 General elections.

In September 2010, he asked President Barack Obama to offer Eid prayers at Ground Zero Mosque to become Ameer-ul-Momineen of Muslim Ummah.

Death
Ayatullah Durrani died on 5 July 2020, from COVID-19 during the COVID-19 pandemic in Pakistan at Fatima Jinnah General and Chest Hospital in Quetta. Five days before his death, he tested positive for Coronavirus and was on ventilator.

References

External links
 Ministry of Industries and Production

1956 births
Pakistan People's Party politicians
People from Kalat District
Government of Yousaf Raza Gillani
2020 deaths
Deaths from the COVID-19 pandemic in Balochistan, Pakistan